Joytime III is the third studio album by American DJ and record producer Marshmello. It was released on July 2, 2019, one day earlier than its planned release date, July 3. The album features collaborations with producers Bellecour, Crankdat, Flux Pavilion, Slushii, Tynan, Wiwek, and Yultron. Joytime III also features vocals by A Day to Remember, Elohim, and Marshmello himself. All 13 songs were released early via a video game release, promoting both the game and the album.

Singles 
"Rescue Me", a collaboration with American band A Day to Remember, was released as the first single from the album on June 14, 2019. "Room to Fall", a collaboration with producers Flux Pavilion and Elohim, was released as the second single on June 27, 2019.

Track listing 
Credits adapted from Tidal.

Charts

References

2019 albums
Marshmello albums
Sequel albums